Maritza Martin Munoz (October 29, 1959 – January 18, 1993) was a woman shot to death by her ex-husband, Emilio Nuñez, at Our Lady Queen of Heaven Cemetery in North Lauderdale, Florida. Nuñez had been interviewed by Ocurrió Así television reporter Ingrid Cruz, who accompanied him when he visited his daughter's grave. While the crew was filming Nuñez at the cemetery, Martin arrived for her own visit, at which time Cruz confronted Martin, who was sitting silently in her vehicle, insisting that Martin answer his questions. Martin and Nuñez' 15-year-old daughter, Yoandra, had killed herself in November 1992 following their discovery of her being 13 weeks pregnant, and Nuñez had blamed the incident on Martin. Nuñez believed that their daughter had been abused by her stepfather and murdered or driven to suicide by her mother. Both theories were rejected by investigators. Yoandra had been raised by Martin; Nuñez was prevented from contact with her.

As Cruz continued banging on Martin's car window, trying to get her to answer questions, Nuñez left the grave site and returned to his vehicle. Martin then left her own car, made a note of Nuñez' license plate number, then turned towards the grave, all while ignoring Cruz' constant barrage of questions. As Martin started silently walking towards the grave, with Cruz still peppering her with questions, Nuñez suddenly returned with a 9 mm semi-automatic pistol, shot Martin in the back of the head, then shot her now prone body several more times. The cameraman managed to film the shots while Cruz started screaming and ran towards the station vehicle. The footage was later used in the film Bowling for Columbine. It was also shown in the 1993 shockumentary film Traces of Death.

At the time of her death, Martin left behind an eighteen-month-old son. She was buried next to her daughter.

In 2000, Emilio Nuñez was found guilty by a jury in Fort Lauderdale, Florida. He was sentenced to life imprisonment, with the possibility for parole after serving 25 years.

See also
 Murders of Alison Parker and Adam Ward

References

External links 
 
 
 Google News Facsimile of Ocala Star-Banner, Jan. 23, 1993. "Victim's husband refutes cemetery shooting details". Retrieved October 5, 2009.
 Seattletimes.com "Woman's Slaying Aired Live On TV -- Mourning Father Shoots Ex-Wife At Daughter's Grave". January 20, 1993. Retrieved October 5, 2009.

1959 births
1993 deaths
1993 murders in the United States
American murder victims
Burials in Florida
Cuban emigrants to the United States
Deaths by firearm in Florida
Female murder victims
Filmed killings
History of women in Florida
People murdered in Florida
Uxoricides